The 1892 Washington & Jefferson football team was an American football team that represented Washington & Jefferson College as an independent during the 1892 college football season. Led by J. J. Clark in his first and only year as head coach, the team compiled a record of 4–0.

Schedule

References

Washington and Jefferson
Washington & Jefferson Presidents football seasons
College football undefeated seasons
Washington and Jefferson football